Julie Blaha is an American politician and retired educator serving as the 19th state auditor of Minnesota since 2019. She is a member of the Minnesota Democratic–Farmer–Labor Party. Before her election as auditor, Blaha served as secretary-treasurer of the Minnesota AFL–CIO, a federation of local trade unions.

Biography 
Born in Burns Township, Minnesota (now the city of Nowthen), Blaha earned a Bachelor of Science from St. Cloud State University and a Master of Education (MEd) from Saint Mary's University of Minnesota. She worked as a middle school math teacher and secretary-treasurer of the Minnesota AFL–CIO. In the 2018 elections, Blaha ran for Minnesota state auditor and defeated Republican Pam Myhra in the general election. She was sworn into office on January 7, 2019. 

Blaha was reelected in 2022, defeating Republican nominee Ryan Wilson.

Blaha and her husband, Roger, live in Ramsey, Minnesota.

Investigations
Blaha's involvement in a State Patrol crash investigation resurfaced six months after an incident in August of 2021. A local media outlet alleged Blaha's passenger in the crash, then Senate Majority Leader Melissa Franzen, was given special treatment related to an open container of alcohol found after the crash. The Minnesota State Patrol responded by stating the incident was thoroughly and objectively investigated.

References

External links

Campaign website

1970 births
21st-century American women
AFL–CIO people
American women educators
Living people
Minnesota Democrats
People from Anoka County, Minnesota
Saint Mary's University of Minnesota alumni
Schoolteachers from Minnesota
St. Cloud State University alumni
State Auditors of Minnesota